Alexey Sobolev (born in Novosibirsk on 1 September 1991) is a Russian snowboarder competing in slopestyle and big air.

Sobolev qualified for the 2014 Winter Olympics where he finished in 20th place in the men's slopestyle, being eliminated in the semifinal.

He garnered attention because his board may reference the band Pussy Riot and because his helmet had his iPhone's telephone number printed on the side until he was forced to cover it up by officials.

Results
 2014 Winter Olympics

References

1991 births
Olympic snowboarders of Russia
Sportspeople from Novosibirsk
Russian male snowboarders
Snowboarders at the 2014 Winter Olympics
Living people
21st-century Russian people